Ostrołęka Voivodeship was a unit of administrative division and local government in Poland in the period 1975–1998. It was superseded by Masovian Voivodeship. Ostrołęka.

Major cities and towns
Population on 31 December 1998.

  Ostrołęka - 55 271
  Wyszków - 26 154
  Ostrów Mazowiecka - 22 592
  Przasnysz - 17 556
  Maków Mazowiecki - 10 651
  Tłuszcz - 6 708
  Różan - 2 906
  Myszyniec - 2 815
  Chorzele - 2 643
  Brok - 1 918

See also
 Voivodeships of Poland

Former voivodeships of Poland (1975–1998)
History of Masovian Voivodeship